Aggrupation of Parties for Prosperity, commonly known as APP and formerly known as Aggrupation of Parties for Progress, is a local political party in the region of Zamboanga Peninsula in the Philippines. It is a political party founded by Romeo Jalosjos as the Alliance of Parties for Progress based in the province of Zamboanga del Norte.

As of 2018, APP is currently allied with Hugpong ng Pagbabago of Sara Duterte. Most of its candidates are allied with different national parties, notably Nacionalista Party and Nationalist People's Coalition.

Electoral history

2013 local elections
Cesar Jalosjos, Zamboanga del Norte's 3rd District representative was fielded for the gubernatorial post with Dapitan vice mayor and former mayor Patri "Jing" Chan running for the vice-gubernatorial post. Both Jalosjos and Chan were defeated by former Dipolog City mayor Berto Uy and Dipolog City Vice Mayor Senen Angeles.

Rolando Yebes, a member of this party, was term-limited being Provincial Governor and was fielded for the post of Second District Representative. He was defeated by incumbent Representative Rosendo "Dodoy" Labadlabad.

2016 local elections
Rolando Yebes, Zamboanga del Norte's former Provincial Governor was fielded to run and reclaim his gubernatorial post with former 2nd District Board Member Ricky Mejorada running for the vice-gubernatorial post. Both Yebes and Mejorada were defeated by incumbent Governor Berto Uy and Vice Governor Senen Angeles.

2019 local elections
In 2018, the party created an alliance with Hugpong ng Pagbabago of Sara Duterte.

Bullet Jalosjos, Zamboanga del Norte's 1st District representative (who is allied with the Nacionalista Party) was fielded for the gubernatorial post with Peter Dominic "Britz" Adaza Hamoy running for the vice-gubernatorial post. Both Jalosjos and Adaza Hamoy were defeated by incumbent Governor Berto Uy and Vice Governor Senen Angeles.

2022 local elections
Rosalina Jalosjos, Dapitan's mayor who is a party member and allied with the Nacionalista Party, was fielded for the gubernatorial post with former governor Rolando "Lando" Yebes running for the vice-gubernatorial post. Jalosjos won in the gubernatorial race against former Dipolog City mayor Evelyn Uy, but Yebes was defeated in the vice gubernatorial race.

Electoral performance

Governor

Notable members
Seth Frederick "Bullet" Jalosjos - Zamboanga del Norte 1st District Representative (2010-2019)
Romeo "Jon-jon" Jalosjos, Jr. - Zamboanga del Norte 1st District Representative (2019–Present); Zamboanga Sibugay 2nd District Representative (2010-2013)
Svetlana "Lana" Jalosjos-de Leon - Baliangao municipal mayor (2010-2013)
Maria Bella Javier - Zamboanga Sibugay 2nd District Board Member (2019–Present)
Maria Esperanza Corazon "Mec" Rillera - Zamboanga Sibugay 2nd District Board Member (2016–Present)
George Castillo - Zamboanga Sibugay 2nd District Board Member (2016–Present)

References

Politics of Zamboanga del Norte
Local political parties in the Philippines
Regionalist parties in the Philippines
Political parties established in 2009